Patrick Baco (born on 7 February 1962) is a French former rugby league player who played as .

Rugby league career

Club 
 XIII Catalan

Honours 
French Championship

 Champion in 1983, 1984 and 1985
 Runner-up in 1986, 1988

Lord Derby Cup

 Champion in 1985
 Runner-up in 1983, 1987

International caps 

 France (2 caps) 1986, against :
 Great Britain

References

External links 
Patrick Baco at rugbyleagueproject.com

1962 births
France national rugby league team players
French rugby league players
Rugby league hookers
XIII Catalan players
Living people